V. C. Vadivudaiyan is an Indian film director and screenwriter. He has worked on Tamil films.

Career
In 2000, Vadivudaiyan planned to make Puththan, starring Arunkumar and Divya Unni. The film was shelved before production ended. Vadivudaiyan eventually made his directorial debut with the film Saamida (2008), after working as an assistant to director Shaji Kailas. The film was entirely shot at Kasi. It had a mediocre box office run and critical reception. His next venture was drama film Thambi Vettothi Sundaram (2011) starring Karan and Anjali. During the making of the film, local people protested against the use of the title and attacked the director on set. The film received mixed reviews with a critic at Behindwoods.com noting the film "could have been much better, only if it had been packaged a bit more cleverly".

In 2012, Vadivudaiyan opened production studio Singam Cinema and announced that he would make a trilingual film titled Chokkanathan. He suggested that Karan would star in the Tamil version, while Saif Ali Khan, Kareena Kapoor and Vidya Balan would feature in the Hindi version. The film failed to materialise. He then made Kanniyum Kaalaiyum Sema Kadhal starring Karan, Tarun Gopi and Tripta Parashar, but the film failed to have a theatrical release.

Unable to release his earlier film, Vadivudaiyan signed up Srikanth and Raai Laxmi to star in a horror film titled Sowkarpettai (2016). He worked on a further horror film, Pottu (2019), starring Bharath, Iniya and Namitha.

Filmography

References

Living people
21st-century Indian film directors
Tamil-language film directors
1977 births